Mats Jansson (born 9 May 1961) is a Swedish former footballer. Jansson made 12 Allsvenskan appearances for Djurgården and scored 0 goals. Jansson played with Djurgården from 1981 to 1985, making 83 appearances and scoring 7 goals for the club in total.

References

Swedish footballers
Djurgårdens IF Fotboll players
Association footballers not categorized by position
Year of birth missing